Harrells is a town in Sampson and Duplin counties, North Carolina, United States. The population was 202 at the 2010 census.

History
The Lewis Highsmith Farm and Dr. John B. Seavey House and Cemetery are listed on the National Register of Historic Places. In 1969, a private Christian school, Harrells Christian Academy was founded in the town.

Geography
Harrells is located in southeastern Sampson County at  (34.729285, -78.199190). A part of the northeastern side of town falls within the southwestern corner of Duplin County.

U.S. Route 421 passes through the town, leading north  to Clinton, the Sampson County seat, and south  to Wilmington. North Carolina Highway 41 leads east  to Wallace and west  to Elizabethtown.

Demographics

As of the census of 2000, there were 187 people, 80 households, and 58 families residing in the town. The population density was 59.3 people per square mile (22.9/km2). There were 86 housing units at an average density of 27.3 per square mile (10.5/km2). The racial makeup of the town was 55.08% White, 40.11% African American, 1.07% Native American, 3.74% from other races. Hispanic or Latino of any race were 5.35% of the population.

There were 80 households, out of which 21.3% had children under the age of 18 living with them, 51.3% were married couples living together, 17.5% had a female householder with no husband present, and 27.5% were non-families. 26.3% of all households were made up of individuals, and 11.3% had someone living alone who was 65 years of age or older. The average household size was 2.34 and the average family size was 2.78.

In the town, the population was spread out, with 17.1% under the age of 18, 7.0% from 18 to 24, 27.3% from 25 to 44, 26.2% from 45 to 64, and 22.5% who were 65 years of age or older. The median age was 44 years. For every 100 females, there were 94.8 males. For every 100 females age 18 and over, there were 101.3 males.

The median income for a household in the town was $29,375, and the median income for a family was $41,250. Males had a median income of $30,625 versus $23,750 for females. The per capita income for the town was $34,534. About 14.3% of families and 14.2% of the population were below the poverty line, including 17.9% of those under the age of eighteen and 10.3% of those 65 or over.

References

Towns in Sampson County, North Carolina
Towns in North Carolina
Towns in Duplin County, North Carolina